Tear tape, also known as tearstrip or tear-off ribbon, is a narrow adhesive tape used to open packaging.  The backing is often a narrow oriented polymer such as polypropylene but other polymers, yarns, and filaments are also used. Many tear tapes use a pressure sensitive adhesive but others have a heat-activated adhesive system.  

Tear tape is usually attached to the inner surface of packaging: paper, paperboard, corrugated fiberboard or plastic film. It is used on common non-durable fast-moving consumer goods such as soft drinks, groceries or toiletries, as well as tobacco products such as cigarettes and cigars, to aid the opening of the packaging. It is also used in courier envelopes and corrugated boxes. Tear tape serves as an easy opening device for the consumer, where it obviates the need for opening tools such as scissors or knives, or the use of excessive force.  Tear tape provides a guide on the tear area, thereby allowing more precise opening which reduces product spillage.

Tear tape is available in several constructions and has a variety of uses.

See also
Wrap rage

References

 Yam, K. L., Encyclopedia of Packaging Technology, John Wiley & Sons, 2009, 

Adhesive tape
Packaging materials